Herochroma serrativalva is a moth of the family Geometridae first described by Jeremy Daniel Holloway in 1982. It is found in Malaysia.

References

Moths described in 1982
Pseudoterpnini
Moths of Asia